Adrianus Johannes Ehnle (1819-1863), a Dutch painter of historical and genre subjects, was born at the Hague in 1819, and studied under C. Kruseman. He died in 1863. Among his works are Cornelis de Witt at Dordrecht and The Reception of a Child at the Orphan House at Haarlem.

References
 

1819 births
1863 deaths
Artists from The Hague
19th-century Dutch painters
Dutch male painters
19th-century Dutch male artists